This is a list of cities and towns in Greenland as of 2021. The term 'city' is used loosely for any populated area in Greenland, given that the most populated place is Nuuk, the capital, with 19,279 inhabitants. In Greenland, two kinds of settled areas are distinguished: illoqarfik (Greenlandic for 'town'; by in Danish) and nunaqarfik (Greenlandic for 'settlement'; bygd in Danish). The difference between the two decreased since the new administrative units were introduced in 2009, with the influence of previous municipality centers decreasing.

As of October 2021, Greenland has 56,523 people living along the coast and many islands. There are no permanent human inland settlements or towns in Greenland; the only inland human settlements that exist are seasonal research stations.

Towns with a population of more than 1,000

There are 13 towns in Greenland with a population exceeding 1,000:

Towns and settlements with a population between 200 and 1,000
There are 14 towns and settlements in Greenland with a population between 200 and 1,000:

Settlements with a population between 100 and 200
There are 14 settlements in Greenland with a population between 100 and 200:

Settlements with a population below 100
There are 30 settlements in Greenland with a population below 100:

See also
 Abandoned sites in Greenland
 List of cities and towns in Greenland before 2008

References 

Towns in Greenland
Greenland
Greenland